The resident-general was the leader of Korea under Japanese rule from 1905 to 1910.

Itō Hirobumi was the first resident-general. There were three residents-general in total. After the annexation of Korea to Japan, the last resident-general, Terauchi Masatake, became the first governor-general.

All names on the list follow Eastern convention (family name followed by given name).

Residents-general

See also 
 Japanese Resident-General of Korea
 Japanese Governor-General of Korea
 List of Japanese governors-general of Korea
 Governor-General of Taiwan

Korea, Japanese Residents-General
Korea, Japanese Residents-General
Japanese Residents-General
Japanese Residents-General